Onosma troodi is a species of flowering plant in the family Boraginaceae, native to Cyprus. It is typically found growing on ultramafic soils.

References

troodi
Endemic flora of Cyprus
Plants described in 1865
Taxa named by Theodor Kotschy